The olive sparrow (Arremonops rufivirgatus) is a species of American sparrow in the family Passerellidae. (Other names include green finch and Texas sparrow.) Its range includes Belize, Costa Rica, Guatemala, Honduras, Mexico, Nicaragua and southern Texas (including the counties of Val Verde, Atascosa, and Nueces).

It has a prominent brown eye streak and a brown-striped crown, with a buff breast, some white belly feathers, and a conical beak. The sexes are similar, while the juvenile is more buff with some streaking on the belly. The olive sparrow looks similar to the green-tailed towhee but is smaller and lacks a rusty cap.

Males sing unmusical chip notes similar to the swamp sparrow.

The nest is built two to five feet above ground, and is large, made of straws, twigs, bark, leaves, and stems. Two to five eggs are laid each season (March to September) and are white and unspotted.

References

Terres, John. K. The Audubon Society Encyclopedia of North American Birds, New York: Alfred A. Knopf, 1980. .

Further reading

Books
Brush, T. 1998. Olive Sparrow (Arremonops rufivirgatus). In The Birds of North America, No. 325 (A. Poole and F. Gill, eds.). The Birds of North America, Inc., Philadelphia, PA.

Theses
Gallegos TL. M.S. (2001). Patterns of avian productivity indices at Santa Ana National Wildlife Refuge (1995-1999). The University of Texas - Pan American, United States, Texas.
Hathcock CR. M.S. (2000). Factors affecting reproductive success in hosts of the bronzed cowbird (Molothrus aeneus) in the lower Rio Grande Valley, Texas. The University of Texas - Pan American, United States, Texas.
Wright PG. M.S. (1996). A comparison of secondary successional woody vegetation in two revegetated fields in South Texas and an assessment of habitat use by the olive sparrow, Arremonops rufivirgatus. The University of Texas - Pan American, United States, Texas.

Articles
Lazcano D, Garcia-De la Pena C, Gamaliel Castaneda G & Gonzalez-Rojas I. (2005). Drymarchon corais (indigo snake). Diet. Herpetological Review. vol 36, no 2.
Parkes KC. (1974). Variation in the Olive Sparrow in the Yucatan Peninsula. Wilson Bulletin. vol 86, no 3. p. 293-295.
Vega JH & Rappole JH. (1994). Effects of scrub mechanical treatment on the nongame bird community in the Rio Grande Plain of Texas. Wildlife Society Bulletin. vol 22, no 2. p. 165-171.
Zink RM, Weller SJ & Blackwell RC. (1998). Molecular phylogenetics of the avian genus Pipilo and a biogeographic argument for taxonomic uncertainty. Molecular Phylogenetics & Evolution. vol 10, no 2. p. 191-201.

olive sparrow
Birds of Central America
Birds of the Rio Grande valleys
Birds of the Yucatán Peninsula
Birds of Belize
Birds of Nicaragua
olive sparrow
olive sparrow